State Highway 69 (SH-69) is a short  state highway in the U.S. state of Idaho. It runs from Kuna to Interstate 84 (I-84) in Meridian.

Route description
State Highway 69 starts at its southern junction and terminus in Kuna. The highway heads eastward for a short distance then turns northward on Meridian Road for several miles until it reaches its northern junction and terminus at Interstate 84, in Meridian.

State Highway 69 is part of the Western Heritage Scenic Byway, in the National Scenic Byways Program.

History
The highway originally continued north through Meridian to a junction with State Highway 44 north of Eagle. This alignment through downtown Meridian included a concurrency with US-30, which followed modern-day Franklin Road and Fairview Avenue. The concurrency was short-lived, lasting from 1973 to 1980. After SH-69 was truncated in the late 1970s, SH-55 was later realigned in 1990 to serve north–south traffic between Meridian and Eagle.

The partial cloverleaf interchange with I-80N (now I-84) originally opened on September 29, 1965, as part of the Nampa–Meridian section of the freeway. It was expanded with an additional ramp in 1983. The interchange was replaced in 2015 with a single-point urban interchange that took 19 months to construct and cost $50.1 million.

Future
Plans are being considered that could extend State Highway 69 southward to a conceptual bypass route that is being considered south of Kuna as listed in conceptual documents in the communities in motion program by COMPASS.

The Idaho Transportation Board began investigating a  extension to Kuna Mora Road in 2022.

Major junctions

References

069
U.S. Route 30
Transportation in Ada County, Idaho